Priyatama ( Sweetheart) is a 1977 Hindi-language musical film, produced by T.C. Dewan under the Modern Pictures banner and directed by Basu Chatterjee. It stars Jeetendra, Neetu Singh, Rakesh Roshan, Asha Sachdev in lead roles and music composed by Rajesh Roshan. Asha Sachdev won Filmfare Award for Best Supporting Actress for portrayal of character of Renu.

Plot
Ravi (Jeetendra) and Dolly (Neetu Singh) live in Bombay with their respective best friends, Vicky (Rakesh Roshan) and Renu (Asha Sachdev). The two get married after the concurrence of Dolly's father, Justice Sinha (Utpal Dutt). However, their pre-marriage romance is unable to withstand the pressures of matrimony with bliss and harmony giving way to bouts of doubt and misunderstanding, leading to the filing of divorce proceedings through their respective lawyers, Kaantewal (I.S. Johar) and Rustomjee (Asrani).

Desperate efforts by Vicky and Renu to prevent the estranged couple from splitting are to no avail. Events take a turn when Justice Sinha visits them ostensibly for treatment of his heart ailment forcing the two to act like a happily married couple to avoid causing him any distress. The retired judge sees through the charade and tries to mend their relationship.

Cast
Jeetendra as Ravi
Neetu Singh as Dolly
Rakesh Roshan as Vicky
Utpal Dutt as Dolly's father Mr. Sinha
Asha Sachdev as Dolly's friend Renu
I. S. Johar as Lawyer Kaantewal
G. Asrani as Lawyer Rustomji
Deven Verma as David Pinto
Sapru as Doctor

Soundtrack

External links
 

1977 films
1970s Hindi-language films
Films directed by Basu Chatterjee
Films scored by Rajesh Roshan